Suryakanth (born 7 July  1960) is a Tamil film actor known for his works predominantly in Tamil films. He has acted more than 300 films so far, and has made his mark as a villain, comedian, in many characters. Suriyakanth has acted in many films, such as Indru Poi Naalai Vaa, Thooral Ninnu pochu, Mann Vasanai, Kizhakku Cheemayile. He made his debut film M. A. Kaja's Vasantha Kaalam released in 1981.

Early life 
Suryakanth's birth name was Pakkiri. He was born in Poondi, Thanjavur district, Tamil Nadu. While studying in the fifth grade, the song footage of a film starring "Kuladeivam" Rajagopal was taken in the Poondi Dam area, which aroused his interest in acting in films. After discontinuing his BA degree, Suryakanth was rechristened by Sandow M. M. A. Chinnappa Thevar to act in films.

Film career 
Initially, he struggled to get an offer in high-profile films, but director K. Bhagyaraj gave Suryakanth a big opportunity to act in Thooral Ninnu Pochchu (1982), where he portrayed a silent villain. His performance in the film was critically praised by the critics and audience. Thereafter, Bhagyaraj constantly gave opportunities for Suryakanth in various roles in his films, establishing him into Tamil cinema.

Filmography 
This is a partial filmography. You can expand it.

1980s

1990s

2000s

2010s

Television 

 Chinna Thambi
 Kana Kaanum Kaalangal

References

External links 
 

Living people
Tamil actors
People from Thanjavur district
1960 births